Haskell Eugene "Hack" Ross (March 28, 1908 – December 9, 1966) was an American trainer of Thoroughbred racehorses based in California who race-conditioned the colt Warfare to National Championship honors in 1959. Hack Ross Avenue, near the site where the defunct Bay Meadows Racetrack once stood in San Mateo, California, is named in his honor.

Prior to his career in horse racing, Ross had been a student at Southern Methodist University in Dallas, Texas where he had been a fullback and letterman with the SMU Mustangs.

References

1908 births
1966 deaths
American horse trainers
SMU Mustangs football players
People from Garland, Texas
Sportspeople from Dallas